Men's floor competition at the 2008 Summer Olympics was held on August 17 at the Beijing National Indoor Stadium.

The eight competitors (with a maximum of two per nation) with the highest scores in qualifying proceeded to the men's floor finals. There, each gymnast performed again; the scores from the final round (ignoring qualification) determined the final ranking.

Final

Qualified competitors

Reserves
The reserves for the Floor event final were:
  (9th place: 6.700 A,  8.875 B, 15.575 Total)
  (10th place: 6.400 A, 9.150 B, 15.550 Total)
  (11th place: 6.500 A, 9.025 B, 15.525 Total)

References
 Qualification results

Gymnastics at the 2008 Summer Olympics
2008
Men's events at the 2008 Summer Olympics